The Sulawesi montane rat (Taeromys hamatus) is a species of rodent in the family Muridae.
It is found only in central Sulawesi, Indonesia, on Mount Lehio, Mount Kanino, and Mount Nokilalaki.

References

Taeromys
Rats of Asia
Endemic fauna of Indonesia
Rodents of Sulawesi
Vulnerable fauna of Asia
Taxa named by Ned Hollister
Taxa named by Gerrit Smith Miller Jr.
Mammals described in 1921
Taxonomy articles created by Polbot